The Chicago reggae festival is a community festival that features food and music from Jamaica as well as other entertainment. The festival brings  performers from all over the world.

See also
List of reggae festivals
Reggae

External links

Music festivals in Chicago
Reggae festivals in the United States